Mielnik  is a village in the administrative district of Gmina Lipiany, within Pyrzyce County, West Pomeranian Voivodeship, in north-western Poland.

Before 1945 the area belonged to Germany as part of Landkreis Soldin in the Prussian Province of Brandenburg. For the history of the region, see Neumark.

References

Mielnik